Boštjan or Bostjan is a given name. Notable people with the name include:

Boštjan Buč (born 1980), Slovenian retired track athlete
Boštjan Burger (born 1966), Slovenian informatician, geographer, panoramic photographer and speleologist
Bostjan Cadez creator of Line Rider, an internet game
Boštjan Cesar (born 1982), Slovenian international footballer
Boštjan Frelih (born 1993), Slovenian footballer
Bostjan Goličič (born 1989), Slovenian ice hockey player
Boštjan Hladnik (1929–2006), Yugoslavian/Slovene filmmaker
Boštjan Kavaš (born 1978), professional handball player
Boštjan Kline (born 1991), Slovenian alpine ski racer
Boštjan Krelj (1538–1567), Slovene Protestant reformer, writer, pastor, linguist and preacher
Boštjan Lipovšek (born 1974), Slovenian classical horn player
Boštjan Maček (born 1972), sport shooter competing in trap
Boštjan Nachbar (born 1980), Slovenian professional basketball player
Boštjan Šimunič (born 1974), retired Slovenian triple jumper
Boštjan Žitnik (born 1971), Yugoslav-born, Slovenian slalom canoeist who competed from the mid-1980s to the mid-1990s
Boštjan Žnuderl (born 1979), Slovenian football midfielder
Boštjan Zupančič (born 1947), Judge at the European Court of Human Rights in Strasbourg, France since 1998

See also
Haji Abad Bostjan, a village in Howmeh Rural District, in the Central District of Damghan County, Semnan Province, Iran
Sveti Boštjan, a small village on the Drava River in the Municipality of Dravograd in the Carinthia region in northern Slovenia
Bosta (disambiguation)
Bostan (disambiguation)
Ostan (disambiguation)

Slovene masculine given names